Kann is a Haitian restaurant by Gregory Gourdet in Portland, Oregon.

Description and history
The restaurant's name means "cane" or "sugarcane" in Haitian Creole.

In 2019, Gourdet announced plans to open Kann in 2020. However, the COVID-19 pandemic forced delays. During the pandemic, Gourdet hosted pop-up restaurants, including Kann Winter Village, which was sponsored by American Express and operated within yurts in the Redd on Salmon Street parking lot. American Express platinum card holders were given early reservation access, followed by other card holders, before opening up to the general public. Kann Winter Village operated for five months.

Initially announced to open in July 2022, the brick and mortar restaurant began operating on August 4. Downstairs is Sousòl, a pan-Caribbean cocktail bar.

Menu
Kann Winter Village's menu included chicken soup with epis-rubbed thighs, potato dumplings, and root vegetables.

Reception 
Waz Wu included Kann in Eater Portland's 2023 list of "Portland’s Primo Special Occasion Restaurants for Vegans and Vegetarians".

References

External links

 
 

2020s establishments in Oregon
Buckman, Portland, Oregon
Haitian restaurants
Haitian-American culture
Latin American restaurants in Portland, Oregon